General Morris may refer to:

Basil Morris (1888–1975), Australian Army major general
David Morris (United States Army officer) (fl. 1970s–2020s), U.S. Army major general
Edmund Finucane Morris (1792–1871), British Army general
Edwin Morris (British Army officer) (1889–1970), British Army general
John Ignatius Morris (1842–1902), Royal Marines lieutenant general
John W. Morris (1921–2013), U.S. Army lieutenant general
Shaun Morris (fl. 1980s–2020s), U.S. Air Force lieutenant general
Staats Long Morris (1728–1800), British Army general
Thomas A. Morris (1811–1904), Indiana Militia brigadier general in service to the Union Army in the American Civil War
William H. H. Morris Jr. (1890–1971), U.S. Army lieutenant general
William H. Morris (1827–1900), Union Army brigadier general

See also
Maurizio Moris (1860–1944), Italian Aeronautical Services lieutenant general 
Attorney General Morris (disambiguation)